International Chrysis (1951 – 26 March 1990) was an American transgender entertainer and protégé to Salvador Dalí.
She also played the damsel in distress in the music video for Van Halen's version of "(Oh) Pretty Woman".

Life and career

International Chrysis was a member of the Hot Peaches troupe and appeared briefly in the 1968 documentary The Queen. She toured drag supper clubs in the 1970s and moved her show to nightclubs in the 1980s, performing her revues Jesus Chrysis Superstar and The Last Temptation of Chrysis. She appeared in the 1990 film Q&A shortly before her death. Chrysis died of liver cancer, attributed to illegal breast enhancement injections and high levels of hormones. A documentary about her life entitled Split: Portrait of a Drag Queen was released posthumously. Dead or Alive briefly recorded under the name "International Chrysis" in her honor.

Death

Chrysis's breasts were injected with a wax that hardened into painful lumps and that eventually seeped into her bloodstream. Along with her use of female hormones, that seepage contributed to a fatal case of liver cancer.

References

External links

1951 births
1990 deaths
American transgender actors
American LGBT entertainers
Transgender entertainers
Transgender women
Deaths from liver cancer
20th-century American LGBT people